State Route 788 (SR 788) is a north–south state highway in the southern portion of the U.S. state of Ohio. The western terminus is at State Route 93 in Jackson.

Created in the late 1930s, State Route 788 acts as a shortcut to avoid communities that State Route 93 passes through between Jackson and Wellston.

Route description
Located entirely in the northern portion of Jackson County, State Route 788 is a route that is not included as a part of the National Highway System, a system of highways that are considered most important for the nation's economy, mobility and defense.

History
State Route 788 was established in 1939.  Originally, the route ran from its intersection with Fairgreens Road northeast of Jackson to its current northern terminus at what was then known as State Route 75 (now State Route 93) west of Wellston.  At the time, the current State Route 788 southwest of Fairgreens Road, and Fairgreens Road heading east from State Route 788, was a part of State Route 124.  In 1971, with the completion of a new four-lane expressway around the southeastern portion of Jackson, State Route 124 was re-routed onto this new expressway.  Consequently, State Route 788 was extended in that year along the portion of former State Route 124 from the Fairgreens Road intersection southwesterly to State Route 788's current southern terminus at State Route 93 in Jackson.

Major intersections

References

External links

788
Transportation in Jackson County, Ohio